Your 64 was a British computer magazine aimed at users of the Commodore 64 and VIC-20 home computers, launched by Sportscene Specialist Press in 1984 as a sister title to Your Spectrum.  Initially a bi-monthly release it later changed to monthly.  The content of issues were balanced between serious and leisure features.  The title lasted 14 issues until it was incorporated into Your Commodore.

References

External links
Article on Your 64
Archived Your 64 magazines on the Internet Archive

Bi-monthly magazines published in the United Kingdom
Monthly magazines published in the United Kingdom
Video game magazines published in the United Kingdom
Commodore 8-bit computer magazines
Defunct computer magazines published in the United Kingdom
Magazines established in 1984
Magazines disestablished in 1985